Goniurosaurus zhelongi, also called the Zhe-long's leopard gecko, is a gecko endemic to China.

References

Goniurosaurus
Reptiles of China
Reptiles described in 2014